In hydrology and related studies, a cline is a comparatively thin, typically horizontal layer within a fluid, in which a property of the fluid varies greatly over a relatively short vertical distance.

Such clines and the respectively varying properties include: 

 Chemocline - chemistry
 Halocline - salinity
 Pycnocline - density
 Thermocline - temperature

Hydrology